Ruellia acutangula is a plant native to the Cerrado vegetation of Brazil.

External links
  Ruellia acutangula

acutangula
Flora of Brazil